Millennium & Copthorne Hotels is a global hospitality management and real estate group, with 125 hotels in 22 countries in Asia, Australasia, Europe, the Middle East and North America. The company is headquartered in Singapore and London. It was listed on the London Stock Exchange and was a constituent of the FTSE 250 Index until it was acquired by City Developments Limited in September 2019. Millennium Hotels and Resorts operates the Lengs, M, Millennium and Copthorne hotel collections.

History
The group's origins date to the early 1970s, when Singapore billionaire Kwek Leng Beng opened the King's Hotel through the Hong Leong Group, the parent company of City Developments Limited (CDL). 

In 1989, CDL Hotels International, which now owned six hotels in Asia, was listed on the Hong Kong Stock Exchange. In 1993, CDL made its first move outside Asia, purchasing the 548-room Gloucester Hotel and The Bailey's Hotel, both in London. In the same year CDL took control of a 13-hotel chain in New Zealand. 

In 1994, CDL entered the US market, purchasing The Millennium Hilton and the Macklowe Hotel, both in New York.

In 1995, CDL Hotels acquired Copthorne Hotels for £219 million. British Caledonian Airways had acquired the Copthorne Hotel at Copthorne, West Sussex, near Gatwick in 1972 and later launched the Copthorne Hotels brand in 1985. 

CDL merged the two chains into Millennium & Copthorne Hotels. In 1996, the chain was listed on the London Stock Exchange.

In 1999, the company acquired the 17-property Regal Hotels chain in the United States and in 2001 it expanded into the Middle East with several management contracts secured in the United Arab Emirates. In 2006 the chain expanded to China, and opened the first of six more hotels in China in 2008.

In 2015, the group announced four new hotels to open in Dubai. Still in 2015, the group's financial results slightly declined due to troubled events affecting tourism worldwide which led to the resignation of its CEO Aloysius Lee. Tan Kian Seng began serving as the interim CEO after Jennifer Fox stepped down as the group's CEO in September 2018, just three months after her appointment. 

In 2019, CDL, which owned a controlling 62.5% stake in Millennium & Copthorne Hotels, bought back the remaining shares for £776.29 million and de-listed the company from the London Stock Exchange.

Clarence Tan was appointed CEO of Millennium and Copthorne Hotels in March 2020, and left the role in July 2020 four months after his appointment.

In May 2020, Millennium & Copthorne announced 910 job losses from its 20 hotels in New Zealand as a result of the COVID-19 pandemic. In reaction to the COVID-19 pandemic, Millennium and Copthorne Hotels created the We Clean We Care We Welcome Global Safety Commitment.

Ownership
In June 2019 the company's board agreed to recommend a takeover offer, valuing the business at £2.23 billion, from City Developments Limited for the shares it does not already own. The transaction became unconditional in September 2019.

Gallery

References

External links

City Developments Limited
Companies based in the Royal Borough of Kensington and Chelsea
Hospitality companies established in 1972
1972 establishments in England